Lee Rose may refer to:

Lee Rose (basketball) (born 1936), American basketball coach
Lee Rose (director), American film and television director
Lee Rose (lighting designer) (born 1955), American lighting designer
Lee Rose (rugby league), Australian rugby league player

See also

Rose (surname)